Sunderland Central is a constituency in the House of Commons of the UK Parliament. It is represented by the Labour Party MP Julie Elliott, who has held the seat since its creation in 2010.

Constituency profile
The Sunderland Central constituency covers both the city centre and Sunderland Docks as well as coastal suburbs such as Fulwell and Ryhope. Nearly all of the middle-class areas of the city are in this constituency and therefore the Conservatives tend to do better in Sunderland Central than either of its neighbours.

The City of Sunderland spans the River Wear and is southeast of Newcastle upon Tyne, with long-distance train and air links, as such it is a base for companies, particularly those requiring a large labour force, including in graphic design and production through to customer service jobs in fields such as insurance and banking.  The public sector is also a source of significant employment, providing a wide range of services. Workless claimants, registered jobseekers, were in November 2012 higher than the national average of 3.8%, at 6.0% of the population based on a statistical compilation by The Guardian, one percentage point higher than Houghton and Sunderland South.  Similarly, the regional average stood at 5.7%.

Boundaries

The City of Sunderland wards of Barnes, Fulwell, Hendon, Millfield, Pallion, Ryhope, St Michael's, St Peter's and Southwick.

Sunderland Central was created for the 2010 general election when the Boundary Commission reduced the number of seats in Tyne and Wear from 13 to 12, with the constituencies in the City of Sunderland, in particular, being reorganised. The constituency was formed primarily from the abolished Sunderland North seat, together with parts of the abolished constituencies of Sunderland South (Hendon and St Michael's wards) and Houghton and Washington East (Ryhope ward).

The reorganisation also created the Houghton and Sunderland South and Washington and Sunderland West constituencies.

Political history 
Sunderland Central is a slightly more marginal seat than its predecessors with a swing of 12.8% from Labour to the Conservatives required for the latter party to win the seat in 2010. This is because it brings together virtually all of the areas of historical Conservative strength, such as Fulwell and St Michaels, into one seat.

Local politics of wards in the seat 

At the 2008 city council elections, held in thirds, the Conservatives carried five of Sunderland Central's nine wards, with Labour winning three and the Liberal Democrats one. However, at the next city council elections held on the same day as the 2010 general election, the Conservatives carried only two of Sunderland Central's nine wards, with Labour winning seven and the Liberal Democrats none.

Members of Parliament

Elections

Elections in the 2010s

See also
 City of Sunderland
 List of parliamentary constituencies in Tyne and Wear
 History of parliamentary constituencies and boundaries in Tyne and Wear
 Houghton and Sunderland South
 Washington and Sunderland West

References
 

Politics of the City of Sunderland
Constituencies of the Parliament of the United Kingdom established in 2010
Parliamentary constituencies in Tyne and Wear
Sunderland